Trinayani is an Indian Telugu language supernatural fiction television series airing on Zee Telugu from 2 March 2020. It stars Ashika Padukone, Chandu B Gowda and Pavitra Jayaram in lead roles. The main plot of the series was taken from Bengali language popular television series Trinayani, which aired on Zee Bangla between 4 March 2019 to 26 July 2020.

Synopsis 
The show is about Nayani's (Ashika Padukone) unique ability to foresee impending danger and peep into the past. She also has an ability to talk with spirits. Gayathri's (Niharika Harasu) spirit talks with Nayani and tells her past and warns her to protect her son Vishal. Nayani marries Vishal (Chandu B Gowda) to save him from a danger. Meanwhile, Thilottama (Pavitra Jayaram) and Jasmine (Priyanka Chowdary) implement evil plans to destroy their relationship. How Nayani strives to protect Vishal from malice?

Cast

Main 
 Ashika Padukone as Trinayani aka Nayani; Vishal's wife; Gayatri and Ganavi's mother; Sumana's sister; Jagadeesh and Thilottama's daughter-in-law
 Chandu B Gowda as Vishal; Nayani's husband; Thilottama's step son;Jagadeesh's son; Gayatri and Ganavi's father

Recurring 
 Priyanka Chowdary as Jasmine; Vishal's love interest
 Pavitra Jayaram as Thilottama; Jagadeesh's second wife; Vishal's step mother;
 Sri Satya as Sumana; Nayani's sister; Vikrant's wife
 Vishnu Priya as Hasini; Vallabha's wife
 Suresh Chandra as Vallabha; Jagadeesh's elder son; Hasini's husband
 Anil Chowdary as Vikrant; Vallabha and Vishal's brother; Sumana's husband
 Challa Chandu as Parasuram; Thilottama's brother
 Bhavana Reddy as Durandhara; Jagadish sister, vallabha, vishal, vikranth's aunt
 Niharika Harasu as Gayathri; Vishal's biological mother;
 Karate Kalyani as Kanthamma; Village head
 Sandra Jayachandran as Dharani; Akhil's wife
 Dwarakesh Naidu as Jagadeesh; Thilottama's husband; Vallabha, Vishal, Vikrant's father
 Sandhya Varalakshmi as Shyamala;
 Adarsh as Akhil; Dharani's husband; donoted his eyes to Vishal
 Nehal Gangavath as Sudha; spirit
 Chitti Prakash as Gangayya
 Mahathi as Ahalya
 Meka Ramakrishna as Nayani's grand father
 Raga Madhuri as Shyamala; Nayani's mother
 Puru Reddy as Varaprasad; Kanthamma's husband

Special Appearances
 Jayalalita as Lalitha Devi

Title song

Adaptations

Production 
Due to COVID-19 outbreak in India, Trinayani and all other television series and films shootings were suspended from 19 March 2020. Three months later, shooting was permitted and commenced from June 2020. The series commenced telecasting new episodes from 22 June 2020.

Reception

References

External links 
 Trinayani at ZEE5

Zee Telugu original programming
Indian supernatural television series
Telugu-language television shows
2020 Indian television series debuts